Soplica is one of the older brands of Polish pure and flavoured vodka, having been first produced in 1891 (in a factory that was opened in 1888). Although the origins of vodka in Poland can be traced back to as early as the 8th century, Soplica is one of the older industrially produced brands of vodka in the country. Żubrówka, for example, is based on a much older recipe than Soplica (dating back to the Polish–Lithuanian Commonwealth) but exists as an industrially produced brand only since the 1920s.

History 
The creator of Soplica vodka was Bolesław Michał Kasprowicz, who in 1888 founded the Fabryka Wódek i Likierów w Gnieźnie (Factory of Vodka and Liqueur in Gniezno). The first bottle of Soplica was produced there in 1891, as proven by the replica of the bottle that is held in the Muzeum Początków Państwa Polskiego w Gnieźnie (Museum of the Origins of the Polish State in Gniezno) to this day. Kasprowicz originally came from the town of Czempiń in the Greater Poland voivodeship. Upon starting his distillery in Gniezno, he quickly became one of the pioneers of alcohol trade of the time. Three years after starting the works, in 1891, Kasprowicz introduced the Soplica clear vodka onto the Polish market. In just a few years, the production facility in Gniezno became a large enterprise, processing as much as 3 wagons of pure spirits a week.

During World War I, Kasprowicz's factory in Gniezno suspended its activity and Kasprowicz himself became involved in nationwide efforts to regain Poland's independence as a sovereign state following 123 years of foreign rule. From the distillery's formation until 1913, Kasprowicz's vodkas and liqueurs earned 73 different awards (including 4 gold medals) on the Polish market and abroad. He became an important figure in the municipality, finally taking office as the city president of Gniezno in 1919. It was not until 1920 that he returned to his role as the manager of his own factory. During the German occupation of Poland in World War II, Kasprowicz was deported to annexed Warsaw by the Nazis and died there in 1943.

The recipes still used for Soplica vodkas and liqueurs were developed by Kasprowicz himself. He was the author of many unique formulas which were handwritten and documented in a tome called recepturarz. All of the wares created by Kasprowicz were marked with the initials B.K. as well as the picture of a carp. The names of all products from his factory referenced Polish tradition and literature. This custom has survived many years, as even now on the labels of modern versions of Soplica vodka there is an image of a dworek (manor houses historically owned by the Polish szlachta) – a reference to the national epic poem Pan Tadeusz by Adam Mickiewicz.

During the first 50 years of its production factories' existence (1888–1939), Kasprowicz's firm earned 93 medals and distinctions for the quality of its products. Since 2009, the pure original version of Soplica as well as its several flavoured variants have been earning numerous awards in both expert and consumer contests. The Soplica brand was acquired by Maspex in 2022. Soplica products are manufactured by Polmos Łańcut in the city of Łańcut, which is located in the Podkarpackie Voivodeship of southeastern Poland.

Variants 

Nowadays Soplica comes as several different products. There are the traditional Soplica vodkas with a 40%  ABV. A spirit of 60%  ABV is sold separately. There are also flavoured variants (commonly known in Polish as nalewki, singular nalewka) which have a lower ABV of 30%. The thirteen drinks distilled as part of the brand are:

Vodka
 Soplica Szlachetna Wódka – Soplica Noble Vodka (pure vodka)
 Soplica Staropolska – Old Polish Soplica
 Soplica Spirytus Nalewkowy – Soplica Nalewka Spirit

Nalewka
 Soplica Malinowa – Raspberry Soplica
 Soplica Orzech Laskowy – Hazelnut Soplica
 Soplica Wiśniowa – Cherry Soplica
 Soplica Pigwowa – Quince Soplica
 Soplica Czarna Porzeczka – Blackcurrant Soplica
 Soplica Śliwkowa – Plum Soplica
 Soplica Orzech Włoski – Walnut Soplica
 Soplica Truskawkowa – Strawberry Soplica
 Soplica Jagodowa – Blueberry Soplica
 Soplica Mirabelkowa – Mirabelle Soplica

See also

 List of vodkas

References 

Polish vodkas
1890s in Poland
Products introduced in 1891
Polish brands
Food and drink companies established in 1891
1891 establishments in Poland